Michael Passenier (born 9 April 1969) is a Dutch kickboxing trainer who owns Mike's Gym in Oostzaan, Netherlands. He is also known by the nickname "Big Mike".

Biography 
Passenier was born and raised in Amsterdam. He played football in his youth. At the age of 15, he attended a kickboxing event for the first time, and became impressed by the visitors and the atmosphere. While working in a bar, he met kickboxing world champion Gilbert Ballantine. Passenier sparred with Ballantine, who appreciated Passenier's skills and invited him to work as an assistant coach. Passenier never entered the professional ring himself.

Mike's Gym
Passenier began teaching martial arts in 2002. A year later, he opened his own gym, named Mike's Gym. Passenier became more known in the world of kickboxing when he trained Joerie Mes, who was considered one of the best combination specialists in kickboxing. The silhouette of Mes was made part of the Mike's Gym logo.

Mike's Gym became one of the biggest martial arts gyms in the Netherlands.  Passenier's pupils are distinguished by their willingness to win by knockout during a bout. They do not use points-oriented tactics. Passenier trained many world champions, including Melvin Manhoef, Badr Hari, Murthel Groenhart and Sahak Parparyan. At certain stages of their careers, he coached top contenders such as Artur Kyshenko, Gökhan Saki, Alistair Overeem, Freddy Kemayo, Björn Bregy, Sergey Adamchuk and Sergei Lashchenko.

On November 26, 2009, a fire broke out in the building next to Jim's Gym, and burned down the Gym. The gym was reopened on March 29, 2010.

In February 2019, Mike's Gym partnered with the well known Vos Gym, led by Ivan Hippolyte. Both gyms operated under one building.

Notable fighters trained

 Joerie Mes
 Melvin Manhoef
 Badr Hari
 Murthel Groenhart 
 Gökhan Saki
 Artur Kyshenko
 Paul Daley
 Sahak Parparyan
 Björn Bregy
 Alistair Overeem
 Giga Chikadze
 Sergey Adamchuk
 Sergei Lashchenko
 Freddy Kemayo
 Cosmo Alexandre 
 Yousri Belgaroui
 Donegi Abena
 Antonio Plazibat
 Stoyan Koprivlenski
 Jamal Ben Saddik
 Anissa Haddaoui
 Mellony Geugjes

References

External links
Mike's Gym Official Website
Official Website

1969 births
Kickboxing trainers
Living people
Martial arts school founders
Mixed martial arts trainers
Sportspeople from Amsterdam